The Minister of the Armed Forces is the leader and most senior official of the French Ministry of the Armed Forces, tasked with running the French Armed Forces. The minister is the third highest civilian having authority over France's military, behind only the President of the Republic and the Prime Minister. Based on the governments, they may be assisted by a minister or state secretary for veterans' affairs.

The office is considered to be one of the core positions of the Government of France.

Since 20 May 2022, the Minister of the Armed Forces has been Sébastien Lecornu, the 45th person to hold the office.

History 
The minister in charge of the Armed Forces has evolved within the epoque and regimes. The Secretary of State of War was one of the four specialised secretaries of state established in France in 1589. This State Secretary was responsible for the French Army (similarly, the Naval Ministers of France and the Colonies was created in 1669). In 1791, the Secretary of State of War became Minister of War, with this ministerial function being abolished in 1794 and re-established in 1795. Since 1930, the position was often referred to as Minister of War and National Defence. In 1947, two years after World War II, the ministry merged with the Ministry of the Navy and the Ministry of Air (created in 1930), while being headed by a Minister of National Defence responsible for the French Armed Forces, often referred to as Minister of the Armies and since 1947 until 2017, designated as Minister of Defence.

Powers and functions 
As the head of the military, the minister is part of the Council of Defence. In addition to their authority over the armed forces, the minister also heads the external and military intelligence community. In this capacity, they are also a member of the National Council of Intelligence.

Although the Minister of the Armed Forces is the official responsible for veterans affairs, they usually delegate their powers to a dedicated subordinate minister or state secretary.

The direct military subordinates of the minister are the:
 Chief of the Defence Staff
 Delegate General for the Armament
 Secretary General for the Administration

Officeholders

Provisional Government

Fourth Republic

Fifth Republic

See also
 Secretary of State of the Navy (France)
 Secretary of State for War (France)
 Ministry of War (France)
 Minister of the Navy (France)
 Minister of Air (France)
 Chief of the Defence Staff (France)
 Major General of the Defence Staff (France)
 Chief of Staff of the French Army
 Chief of Staff of the French Air and Space Force
 Chief of Staff of the French Navy
 Special Operations Command (France)
 Directorate General of the National Gendarmerie

References

 
France